Neveroddoreven (sometimes stylised as NeveroddoreveN) is the second studio album by English electronic music duo I Monster. It was originally released on 21 July 2003 by Instant Karma sublabel Dharma Records during "a period of transition for the band's label". It was recorded in the home studio of band member Dean Honer. The title is a palindrome. "The Blue Wrath" was used in the 2004 British comedy Shaun of the Dead and appeared on the movie's soundtrack. The I Monster version of "Daydream in Blue" was used as theme music for the 2002 French action movie Steal and appeared in a television commercial for the Ford Focus ST in 2005. The song was also used in the 2016 episode "eps2.0_unm4sk-pt1.tc" in Season 2 of Mr. Robot. In his review of the album for Jockey Slut, Ben Mortimer said that it contained "playful, twisted pop tunes."

Track listing

All tracks written, produced, and performed by Dean Honer and Jarrod Gosling unless otherwise noted.
"Dinner Jazz" is hidden, found only by rewinding to before the first track.
"Some Thing's Coming" – 3:27
"Daydream in Blue" – 3:39
Sample: "Daydream" performed by the Gunter Kallmann Choir
"Hey Mrs." – 4:16
Guitar: Richard Hawley
"Everyone's a Loser" – 3:16
Backing vocals: Nesreen Shah
Guitar: Duncan Wheat
Guitar: Richard Hawley
"Heaven" – 3:54
Backing vocals: Tiana Krahn
Sample: "When You Are Gone" by Jim Reeves
"Who Is She?" – 3:31
Sample: "The Vengeance of She (Who Is She?)" by Mario Nascimbene from the soundtrack of the 1968 film The Vengeance of She
"I Missed You So" – 0:56
"Stobart's Blues" – 4:41
Guitar: Richard Hawley
"The Backseat of My Car" – 4:14
Vocals: Marion Benoist (of The Lovers)
Trombone: Simon Stafford (of The Longpigs)
"A Scarecrow's Tale" – 0:49
"These Are Our Children" – 4:08
Vocals: Julia Roddison and Ruth Myczko
Backing vocals: Pupils of The Yorkshire School of Performing Arts
"The Blue Wrath" – 1:33
The backing music is taken from one of the rhythm soundbanks of the legendary British instrument the mellotron
"Sunny Delights" – 4:40
Vocals: Marion Benoist
Sample: "Sunny" (Bobby Hebb) performed by Val Doonican
"Cells" – 4:29
Bass: Dave Williamson
"Big End" – 6:30
Drums: Ross Orton
The song "Big End" ends at minute 1:40. After 2 minutes of silence (1:40 - 3:40), begins the hidden song "Lucifer You Are a Devil".

NeveroddoreveN: Remodeled
The album was re-released in 2004 by Instant Karma with different album artwork and a revised track list appealing to the label's perception of popular demand. While the word Remodeled does not officially appear on the album, it is often used to help distinguish it from the original. "Hey Mrs." was replaced with a remix that gained popularity through use in advertisements, including commercials for Absolut Vodka and the television series Eureka. A small section of "Stobart's Blues" was removed, "The Backseat of My Car" was also remixed, and "The Blue Wrath" was expanded.

Remodeled track listing
"Cells" is hidden, found only by rewinding to before the first track.
Bass: Dave Williamson
"Some Thing's Coming" – 3:27
"Daydream in Blue" – 3:40
Sample: "Daydream" performed by the Gunter Kallman Choir
"Hey Mrs. [Glamour Puss Mix]" – 4:38
Guitar: Richard Hawley
Additional guitar: Fred de Fred (of The Lovers)
"Everyone's a Loser" – 3:15
Backing vocals: Nesreen Shah
Guitar: Duncan Wheat
Guitar: Richard Hawley
"Heaven" – 3:54
Backing vocals: Tiana Krahn
Sample: "When You Are Gone" by Jim Reeves
"Who Is She?" – 3:30
Sample: "The Vengeance of She (Who Is She?)" by Mario Nascimbene from the soundtrack of the 1968 film The Vengeance of She
"A Scarecrow's Tale" – 0:42
"Stobart's Blues" – 4:20
"The Backseat of My Car [Sticky Black Vinyl Mix]" – 3:01
Vocals: Marion Benoist
Trombone: Simon Stafford
Drums: Ross Orton
"These Are Our Children" – 4:06
"Sunny Delights" – 4:50
"The Blue Wrath [Extended Version]" – 2:32
 "Lucifer You Are A Devil" appears again as the final (hidden) track on the album.

The hidden track "Cells" does not appear on the mp3 version of the album. "Lucifer" has been appended to "The Blue Wrath"

References

 Neveroddoreven at discogs
 Neveroddoreven Remodeled at discogs

I Monster albums
2003 albums
Music in Sheffield